Tapuruia is a genus of beetles in the family Cerambycidae, containing the following species:

 Tapuruia beebei (Fisher, 1944)
 Tapuruia felisbertoi Lane, 1973
 Tapuruia jolyi Napp & Martins, 1985

References

Ibidionini